David Michael Morehead (born September 5, 1942) is a former Major League Baseball pitcher. A right-hander, Morehead pitched for the Boston Red Sox (1963–68) and Kansas City Royals (1969–70).

As a rookie in  Morehead broke into the Red Sox starting rotation and posted a 10–13 record with a 3.81 earned run average. He shut out the Washington Senators in his Major League debut on April 13. On May 12 of that same year, he pitched a one-hitter against the same Senators, the lone hit coming on a Chuck Hinton home run.

In  Morehead went 8–15 and his ERA ballooned to 4.97. In  he tied for the American League lead with 18 losses, against 10 victories, for a Red Sox team that finished next-to-last, with 100 losses. On September 16 of the latter year, the same day the Red Sox fired Pinky Higgins as general manager, Morehead no-hit the Cleveland Indians 2–0 before only 1,247 fans in a day game at Fenway Park, the lone baserunner coming on Rocky Colavito's second-inning walk. Parnell's and Wilson's no-hitters, like Morehead's, had also been pitched at Fenway Park—one of Major League Baseball's most notorious hitter-friendly stadiums. It would be another 37 years before a Red Sox pitcher threw a no-hitter at Fenway.

Over the next three years, Morehead would be beset by arm ailments that limited him to 33 games pitched—one fewer than in 1965. He was a member of the Carl Yastrzemski-led  Red Sox team that won the American League pennant and pitched two games in relief in the World Series, which the Red Sox lost to the St. Louis Cardinals in seven games. In  he pitched in 28 games and posted a 3.62 ERA, the lowest of his career.

In his career, Morehead won 40 games against 64 losses with a 4.15 ERA and 627 strikeouts in 819 innings pitched. He also exhibited periods of wildness, walking 463 batters during his career. In each of his first three seasons, Morehead was second in the American League in walks with 99, 112 and 113 respectively.

See also
 List of Major League Baseball no-hitters

External links

 Boxscore of Morehead's no hitter

Boston Red Sox players
Kansas City Royals players
Baseball players from San Diego
Toronto Maple Leafs (International League) players
Seattle Rainiers players
Johnstown Red Sox players
Louisville Colonels (minor league) players
1942 births
Living people
Arizona Instructional League Royals players
Florida Instructional League Red Sox players